Bernard Tan Tiong Gie (born 1943 in Singapore) was educated at the Anglo-Chinese School, Singapore, the University of Singapore (Bachelor of Science with Honours in Physics, 1965) and Oxford University (Doctor of Philosophy in Engineering Science, 1968). He is a Chartered Engineer and Member of the Institution of Electrical Engineers (UK), Fellow of the Institute of Physics (U.K), Fellow of the Institute of Physics, Singapore, and Fellow of Trinity College of Music, London.

Academic career

Tan joined the then University of Singapore (now the National University of Singapore) in 1968 as a lecturer in Physics and served first as Vice-Dean and then as Dean of Science of the Faculty of Science at NUS for 12 years from 1985 to 1997. He has also been Head of Physics, Acting Head of Music, and Associate Director of the Centre for Musical Activities and Dean of Students. Other appointments previously held by Tan are Chairman of the Centre for Remote Imaging, Sensing and Processing (CRISP) and the Singapore Synchrotron Light Source (SSLS).

Bernard Tan's current research interests are in microwave solid-state properties and devices, digital musical analysis and synthesis, and directional perception of multiple sound sources. He has published over 85 papers in international peer-reviewed journals.

Musical career

As a composer, U.S. music publisher Neil Kjos has published a number of his choral works, and his Piano Concerto was premiered in January 2002 by the Singapore Symphony Orchestra (SSO). In 2006, the SSO performed the world premier of his new Violin Concerto with violinist Lynnette Seah as soloist.

Other career
He is Chairman of the Singapore Arts Festival Steering Committee, the Singapore Youth Awards Science and Technology Advisory Committee and Cadi Scientific. He is President of the Institute of Physics Singapore and Vice-President of the Singapore National Academy of Science.

He was also a former independent non-executive director of Keppel Corporation from 2003 to 2015.

Awards and honours 
Tan has been awarded the Public Administration Medal (Silver), the Public Service Medal, the Public Service Star and the Public Service Star (Bar).

References

External links
Bernard Tan Faculty Web Page
Composed Songs and Pieces

21st-century classical composers
Singaporean people of Chinese descent
Singaporean composers
Singaporean classical musicians
Anglo-Chinese School alumni
Fellows of the Institute of Physics
Academic staff of the National University of Singapore
1943 births
Living people
Singaporean engineers
Male classical composers
Recipients of the Pingat Pentadbiran Awam
Recipients of the Bintang Bakti Masyarakat
21st-century male musicians